Aspergillus microcysticus is a species of fungus in the genus Aspergillus. Aspergillus microcysticus produces aspochalasin A, aspochalasin C, aspochalasin D, and the antibiotic  asposterol.

Growth and morphology

A. microcysticus has been cultivated on both Czapek yeast extract agar (CYA) plates and Malt Extract Agar Oxoid® (MEAOX) plates. The growth morphology of the colonies can be seen in the pictures below.

References

Further reading
 
 
 

microcysticus
Fungi described in 1955